Kevin Hunter Sharp (born January 22, 1963) is a former United States district judge of the United States District Court for the Middle District of Tennessee.

Early life and education
Sharp was born on January 22, 1963, in Memphis, Tennessee. He earned an Associate of Arts from Mesa Community College in 1988. Sharp then received a Bachelor of Science, summa cum laude, from Christian Brothers College (now known as Christian Brothers University) in 1990 and a Juris Doctor from Vanderbilt University School of Law in 1993.

Judicial nomination
During the 111th Congress, Democrats from the Tennessee House delegation provided recommendations to the Obama White House for filling a vacancy on the United States District Court for the Middle District of Tennessee. Sharp, himself a Democrat, was included on the original list of recommendations, but the delegation ultimately recommended Nashville attorney Kathryn Barnett as its first choice. However, Sharp was the preferred choice of Republican Tennessee Senators Lamar Alexander and Bob Corker.

Federal judicial service
On November 17, 2010, President Barack Obama nominated Sharp to a judgeship on the Middle District of Tennessee. His nomination was for the seat vacated by Judge Robert L. Echols. On April 14, 2011, the Senate scheduled a vote on his nomination for May 2, 2011 and the Senate confirmed his nomination by a vote of 89 to 0. He received his commission on May 3, 2011, and served as Chief Judge beginning October 1, 2014. On January 26, 2017, he sent a letter to President Trump resigning his judgeship effective April 15, 2017.

Personal
Sharp's former father-in-law, Lew Conner, is a former state court judge and a prominent Republican fundraiser who has donated over forty thousand dollars to the campaigns and political action committees of Senators Lamar Alexander and Bob Corker.

References

External links

1963 births
Christian Brothers University alumni
Living people
Judges of the United States District Court for the Middle District of Tennessee
People from Memphis, Tennessee
Tennessee Democrats
Tennessee lawyers
United States district court judges appointed by Barack Obama
21st-century American judges
United States Navy sailors
Vanderbilt University alumni